Isménia Júnior (born 1985) is Miss Angola Universe 2006.

Her interests include cooking, dance, music, sports, and reading. Growing up in Cabinda, she stands at 5' 8" and admires former South African President Nelson Mandela.

References

External links
Junior in a group photograph, accessed April 8, 2010.

1985 births
Living people
Angolan beauty pageant winners
Miss Angola winners
Miss Universe 2006 contestants